Gabriel Some Yoryan was the architect of a military coup against Colonel Saye Zerbo, the then head of the army of Burkina Faso. He did not himself assume power, but allowed Major Jean-Baptiste Ouédraogo to take over.

Yoryan was killed later on in another coup launched by Captain Thomas Sankara.

References

Burkinabé military personnel